Margaret Jones Bolsterli (October 10, 1931 in Watson, Arkansas) is an American author, editor, and professor emerita of English. In 2012 she won the Porter Fund Literary Prize.

Biography 
Margaret Jones grew up, with her sister Pauline and her brothers Jodie and Bob, in the Mississippi flood plain of Desha County, Arkansas. There her father owned about 200 acres, which were worked by tenant farmers using mules, until the changes brought by mechanization and WW II. She graduated from high school in Dumas, Arkansas — her high school graduating class consisted of twenty-eight students.

Margaret Jones graduated in 1952 with a bachelor's degree from the University of Arkansas and in 1952 with an M.A. from Washington University in St. Louis. There she met Mark Bolsterli, who was a graduate student in physics. They married and had two sons, Eric (born 1957), and David (1959–2019). During the 1960s the couple divorced. She graduated with a Ph.D. in 1967 from the University of Minnesota. Her Ph.D. thesis is entitled Bedford Park: a practical experiment in aesthetics. She was from 1967 to 1968 an assistant professor at Augsburg College and from 1968 to 1993 a professor of English at the University of Arkansas. For the academic year 1987–1988 she was a Fulbright lecturer in Portugal. For the academic year 1997–1998 the Program in Agrarian Studies at Yale University gave her a fellowship to study agrarian history. After retiring in 1993 as professor emerita, she lived and worked on her farm near Wesley, Arkansas. For many years she has had a close relationship with Olivia Sardo (b. 1944).

In addition to her books and articles, Margaret Jones Bolsterli wrote the libretto for an opera During Wind and Rain, which premiered in April 2017 at the Argenta Community Theater in North Little Rock. The music for the opera was written by Michael Rice.

Books
 ; 
 ; 
 
 
 
 as editor:
 
 ;  hbk

References

1931 births
Living people
Writers from Arkansas
American non-fiction writers
American women writers
People from Desha County, Arkansas
University of Arkansas alumni
Washington University in St. Louis alumni
University of Minnesota alumni
University of Arkansas faculty
20th-century American women writers
21st-century American women writers
American women academics